The 24th National Film Awards, presented by Directorate of Film Festivals, the organisation set up by Ministry of Information and Broadcasting, India to felicitate the best of Indian Cinema released in the year 1976.

Awards 

Awards were divided into feature films and non-feature films.

Lifetime Achievement Award

Feature films 

Feature films were awarded at All India as well as regional level. For 24th National Film Awards, a Hindi film, Mrugaya won the President's Gold Medal for the All India Best Feature Film. Following were the awards given in each category:

All India Award 

Following were the awards given:

Regional Award 

The awards were given to the best films made in the regional languages of India.

All the awardees are awarded with 'Silver Lotus Award (Rajat Kamal)', a certificate and cash prize.

Non-Feature films 
Not Available

Awards not given 

Following were the awards not given as no film was found to be suitable for the award

 Best Film on Family Welfare
 Best Children's Film
 Best Lyrics
 Best Feature Film on National Integration
 President's Silver Medal for Best Feature Film in English
 President's Silver Medal for Best Feature Film in Punjabi
 President's Silver Medal for Best Feature Film in Tamil

References

External links 
 National Film Awards Archives
 Official Page for Directorate of Film Festivals, India

National Film Awards (India) ceremonies
National Film Awards
National Film Awards
National Film Awards